Rockland Ranch (also known as "The Rock") is a fundamentalist Mormon, polygamous community in Moab, Utah.  The community was founded in 1977 by Robert Dean Foster (d. 2008) as a place for fundamentalist Mormons to live and practice plural marriage out of the public eye. There were fifteen families involved in the community's formation. The ranch's name is derived from the rockface in which the community's homes are built with the aid of dynamite. This buildinng technique was utilized in order to provide the residents from Utah's extreme weather.

Today, of the 35-ish families in the community, around half contain plural marriages. Rockland Ranch hosts annual events that draw fundamentalist Mormons from around the country.

In media 
Rockland Ranch is the setting for the Netflix reality TV series Three Wives, One Husband, which follows the lives of the Foster and Morrison families for a year. In addition, Heidi Foster, one of the wives of Robert Forest's son Enoch Foster, is the mother of Jessica Christensen, star of the reality show Escaping Polygamy.

References 

Fundamentalist Church of Jesus Christ of Latter-Day Saints
Polygamy
1977 establishments in Utah
Moab, Utah
Mormon fundamentalism
Mormonism and polygamy